Jari Kauppila (born February 23, 1974) is a Finnish ice hockey centre playing with Lahti Pelicans in the Finnish SM-liiga.

Kauppila made his SM-liiga debut with Hockey-Reipas during the 1991–92 SM-liiga season.

Career statistics

Awards
 SM-liiga (1): 1996–97
 SM-liiga (1): 1999–00
 Elitserien, Le Mat Trophy (1): 2007–08
 Mestis champion (1): 2013–14

References

External links

1974 births
Living people
Finnish ice hockey centres
HIFK (ice hockey) players
HPK players
Jokerit players
KooKoo players
Lahti Pelicans players
Leksands IF players
Luleå HF players
People from Hämeenlinna
Tingsryds AIF players
Sportspeople from Kanta-Häme